TIROS 4 (also called TIROS-D and A9) was a spin-stabilized meteorological satellite. It was the fourth in a series of Television Infrared Observation Satellites.

Launch 
TIROS 4 was launched on February 8, 1962, by a Thor-Delta rocket from Cape Canaveral Air Force Station, Florida. The spacecraft functioned nominally until June 30, 1962. The satellite orbited the Earth once every 1 hour and 30 minutes, at an inclination of 48.3°.

Mission 
The satellite was in the form of an 18-sided right prism, 107 cm in diameter and 56 cm high. The top and sides of the spacecraft were covered with approximately 9000 1- by 2-cm silicon solar cells. It was equipped with two independent television camera subsystems for taking cloud cover pictures and three radiometers (two-channel low-resolution, omnidirectional, and five-channel scanning) for measuring radiation from the earth and its atmosphere. The satellite spin rate was maintained between 8 and 12 rpm by the use of five diametrically opposed pairs of small solid-fuel thrusters. 

The TIROS-4 spin axis could be oriented to within 1° to 2° accuracy by use of a magnetic control device consisting of 250 cores of wire wound around the outer surface of the spacecraft. The interaction between the induced magnetic field in the spacecraft and the earth's magnetic field provided the necessary torque for attitude control. The flight control system also optimized the performance of the solar cells and television cameras and protected the 5 channel infrared radiometer from prolonged exposure to direct sunlight. 

With the exception of the degraded response of the 5 channel scanning radiometer, the spacecraft performed normally until May 3, 1962, when one camera failed. On June 10, 1962, the other camera's tape recorder failed. The scanning radiometer provided usable data until June 30, 1962.

References

External links
 TIROS. Encyclopedia Astronautica
 Real Time Satellite Tracking - TIROS 4. N2yo.com.

Weather satellites of the United States
Spacecraft launched in 1962